Statistics of Bahraini Premier League in the 1978–79 season.

Overview
Al Hala won the championship.

References
RSSSF

Bahraini Premier League seasons
Bah
football